The Women's 4x200m freestyle relay event at the 2010 South American Games was held on March 26 at 19:09.

Medalists

Records

Results

Final

References
Final

Relay 4x200m W